Gary Ennis Collins (April 30, 1938 – October 13, 2012) was an American actor and television host. Throughout his career, he won a Daytime Emmy Award in 1984 and received a star on the Hollywood Walk of Fame in 1985.

Early life and education
Collins was born in Venice, California. He was raised there by a single mother, who was a waitress and factory worker. Collins attended Venice High School and graduated with the class of 1955. After attending Santa Monica College, he went into the United States Army.

Early career
Collins enlisted in the Army and served in Europe, where he was a radio and television performer for the Armed Forces Network. After his return, he performed at the Barter Theatre, a year-round repertory theatre in Abingdon, Virginia, whose director Robert Porterfield provided chances for many aspiring actors.

Film and television
Collins made a career in television, co-starring, with Jack Warden and Mark Slade, in the 1965 series The Wackiest Ship in the Army. He co-starred, with Dale Robertson and Robert Random, in the 1966–1968 series Iron Horse.  He starred in the 1972 television series The Sixth Sense, in syndication part of Rod Serling's Night Gallery, as the parapsychologist and extrasensory perception-gifted Dr. Michael Rhodes. In 1974, he starred in the series Born Free, based on the life of George Adamson, a wildlife conservationist best known for his work with lions. Collins appeared in two episodes of Perry Mason: in 1965, he played assistant district attorney and defendant Larry Germaine in the 1965 episode, "The Case of the Fatal Fetish", and in 1966, he played murderer Alex Tanner in "The Case of the Crafty Kidnapper".

Collins also appeared in an episode of Barnaby Jones titled "Deadly Reunion" (02/12/1976). He appeared in the episode "You're Not Alone" from the 1977 anthology series Quinn Martin's Tales of the Unexpected (known in the United Kingdom as Twist in the Tale). He also starred in three episodes of the British TV series Thriller; 'Only A Scream Away' (1973), 'The Double Kill' (1975) and 'Dial a Deadly Number' (1976). He is the only actor to have appeared in more than two episodes of Thriller during its three-year run. 

Collins also had many movie roles, including The Pigeon That Took Rome (1962), Angel in My Pocket (1969) also starring Andy Griffith, the original Airport (1970), Quarantined (1970), Houston, We've Got a Problem (1974), The Night They Took Miss Beautiful (1977), the horror thriller Killer Fish (1979), starring Lee Majors, Watchers Reborn (1998), and The Jungle Book: Search for the Lost Treasure (1998). He also played an American astronaut involved in a UFO coverup in the 1980 film Hangar 18.

Collins hosted the television talk show Hour Magazine from 1980 to 1988, and co-hosted the television series The Home Show from 1989 to 1994. He was the host of the Miss America Pageant from 1982 to 1990. His wife Mary Ann Mobley and he replaced Bob Barker as co-hosts of the Pillsbury Bake-Off from 1984 to 1988.

Awards
Collins was nominated for an Emmy Award six times and won in 1983 for Outstanding Talk Show Host. In 1985, he received a star on the Hollywood Walk of Fame.

Personal life and death
Collins was first married to Susan Peterson, with whom he had two children: Guy William and Melissa Collins. They divorced.

In 1967, Collins married Mary Ann Mobley, Miss America (1959). They had one child, a daughter, Mary Clancy Collins. They separated in 2010, but reconciled soon after. He moved to her home state of Mississippi to be with her in 2012 while she battled breast cancer.

Collins died around 1:00 am on October 13, 2012, at Biloxi Regional Medical Center in Biloxi, Mississippi, of natural causes.

Legal issues
The final decade of Collins's life was marred by several run-ins with the law. In January 2008, Collins served four days in jail in Glendale, California, for his second DUI conviction. He was arrested a year later, on January 31, 2009, in Santa Barbara County, California, and pleaded no contest to driving a motor home while drunk. Collins was then sentenced to 120 days home detention, according to a Santa Barbara County Sheriff's Office spokesperson. His blood alcohol content was measured at 0.29, more than three times the legal limit.

In November 2010, Collins was charged with a misdemeanor for leaving the scene of an accident in Jackson, Mississippi and fined $500. On January 5, 2011, Collins was charged with defrauding an innkeeper, a felony, in Harrison County, Mississippi, for allegedly failing to pay his bill at Jazzeppi's Restaurant, according to a statement released by the Biloxi Police Department. Collins said the restaurant was taking too long to deliver his dinner, so he left and refused to pay the bill. The restaurant owner later said the arrest was due to a misunderstanding, and the charges against Collins were dropped.

Filmography

References

External links

1938 births
2012 deaths
American male film actors
American male television actors
American television talk show hosts
People from Venice, Los Angeles
Male actors from Los Angeles
Santa Monica College alumni
Westinghouse Broadcasting
Daytime Emmy Award for Outstanding Talk Show Host winners
20th-century American male actors
21st-century American male actors
Venice High School (Los Angeles) alumni